Power Station or The Power Station may refer to:

 Power station, a facility for the generation of electricity

Music
 The Power Station (band), a 1980s supergroup
 The Power Station (album), a 1985 album by The Power Station
 Power Station (Taiwanese band), a Taiwanese rock duo
 Kraftwerk (German for power station), a German musical group
 The Power Station Years: The Unreleased Recordings, a 1998 compilation by Jon Bon Jovi
 Power Station (recording studio), a recording studio in New York City
 Powerstation, a 2019 album by British band BBMak

Other uses
 Power Station of Art, a contemporary art museum in Shanghai
 The Power Station (art space), a gallery in Dallas, Texas
 The Power Station (TV channel), a British television channel
 Power station (UTA), a light rail station in Utah
 Power Station, a category of high capacity power banks often with built in pure sine wave inverter and multiple household sockets

See also
 Power plant (disambiguation)